Jaunsvente Manor, also called Svente Manor, is a manor house in Svente, Svente Parish, Augšdaugava Municipality in the Selonia region of Latvia. The renovated building is now managed by the SIA “Jaunsventes muiža”, which provides accommodations in their 12 rooms, each corresponding to one of the twelve months of the year.

History
After the disposal of the estate by the Latvian government during the agrarian reform of 1922, the manor housed the Svente school. Construction was completed in 1912, apparently according to the architectural design of Wilhelm Neumann. The park was landscaped during the first half of the 19th century.

The restored country house of the Plater-Cyberk counts currently houses a museum in the grounds of the Jaunsvente estate. Among the exhibits are a Red Army heavy IS-2 tank, standard T-34 tanks, armored vehicles BRDM-1, BRDM-2, GAZ-67 trucks and a Willys Jeep.

See also
List of palaces and manor houses in Latvia

References

External links
  Jaunsvente Manor
 

Manor houses in Latvia
Augšdaugava Municipality
Plater family
Military and war museums
Museums in Latvia
Selonia